James F. Sikes (died 1938) was a state senator in Florida.

Sikes was born in Inverness, Florida. He graduated from the University of Florida.

Sikes was elected to the Florida Senate in 1932 and served until 1934.

References

Date of birth missing
1938 deaths
Florida state senators
People from Inverness, Florida
University of Florida alumni